Milan Gajić (Serbian Cyrillic: Милан Гајић; born 17 November 1986) is a Serbian professional footballer who plays as an attacking midfielder for Liechtenstein club FC Vaduz.

Career
Gajić started his professional career with Napredak Kruševac, together with Predrag Pavlović and Nikola Mitrović. He was also loaned to Boavista in the fall of 2007.

In July 2008, Gajić signed a contract with Luzern. He scored three goals in 23 league appearances in the 2008–09 season.

On 5 May 2009, Gajić signed a four-year contract with Zürich. He scored the opener in a 1–1 home draw with Milan on 8 December 2009. In the 2011 winter transfer window, Gajić was loaned to Grasshoppers.

In the summer of 2013, Gajić signed a contract with Young Boys.

Honours

FC Vaduz
Liechtenstein Football Cup (2): 2017-18, 2018-19

References

External links

 
 

Serbian footballers
Association football midfielders
Boavista F.C. players
BSC Young Boys players
Expatriate footballers in Portugal
Expatriate footballers in Switzerland
Expatriate footballers in Liechtenstein
FC Luzern players
FC Zürich players
FK Napredak Kruševac players
Grasshopper Club Zürich players
FC Vaduz players
Primeira Liga players
Serbian expatriate footballers
Serbian expatriate sportspeople in Portugal
Serbian expatriate sportspeople in Switzerland
Serbian SuperLiga players
Sportspeople from Kruševac
Swiss Super League players
1986 births
Living people
Serbian expatriate sportspeople in Liechtenstein